Čiukiškiai (formerly) is a village in Kėdainiai district municipality, in Kaunas County, in central Lithuania. According to the 2011 census, the village was uninhabited. There is a pig farm. An ancient burial place is located next to the village.

History
The first mention of Čiukiškiai is dated in 1593. There were 31 voloks of the land at that time. Two ancient axes have been found in the village.

Demography

References

Villages in Kaunas County
Kėdainiai District Municipality